Gwynedd is a county and preserved county (latter with differing boundaries; includes the Isle of Anglesey) in the north-west of Wales. It shares borders with Powys, Conwy County Borough, Denbighshire, Anglesey over the Menai Strait, and Ceredigion over the River Dyfi. The scenic Llŷn Peninsula and most of Snowdonia National Park are in Gwynedd. Bangor is the home of Bangor University.

As a local government area, it is the second largest in Wales in terms of land area and also one of the most sparsely populated. A majority of the population is Welsh-speaking. Gwynedd also refers to one of the preserved counties of Wales, covering the two local government areas of Gwynedd and Anglesey. Named after the old Kingdom of Gwynedd, both culturally and historically, Gwynedd can also be used for most of North Wales, such as the area that was policed by the Gwynedd Constabulary. The population decreased significantly as of the 2021 census to 117,393

Etymology 
In the past, historians such as J. E. Lloyd assumed that the Celtic source of the word "Gwynedd" meant "collection of tribes" – the same root as the Irish fine, meaning "tribe". Further, a connection is recognised between the name and the Irish Féni, an early ethnonym for the Irish themselves, related to fían, "company of hunting and fighting men, company of warriors under a leader". Perhaps *u̯en-, u̯enə (strive, hope, wish) is the Indo-European stem. The Irish settled in NW Wales, and in Dyfed, at the end of the Roman era. Venedotia was the Latin form, and in Penmachno there is a memorial stone from c. AD 500 which reads: Cantiori Hic Iacit Venedotis ("Here lies Cantiorix, citizen of Gwynedd"). The name was retained by the Brythons when the kingdom of Gwynedd was formed in the 5th century, and it remained until the invasion of Edward I. This historical name was revived when the new county was formed in 1974.

History

Gwynedd was an independent kingdom from the end of the Roman period until the 13th century, when it was conquered by England. The modern Gwynedd was one of eight Welsh counties created on 1 April 1974 under the Local Government Act 1972. It covered the entirety of the historic counties of Anglesey and Caernarfonshire, and all of Merionethshire apart from Edeirnion Rural District (which went to Clwyd); and also a few parishes of Denbighshire: Llanrwst, Llansanffraid Glan Conwy, Eglwysbach, Llanddoged, Llanrwst and Tir Ifan.

The county was divided into five districts: Aberconwy, Arfon, Dwyfor, Meirionnydd and Anglesey.

The Local Government (Wales) Act 1994 abolished the 1974 county (and the five districts) on 1 April 1996, and its area was divided: the Isle of Anglesey became an independent unitary authority, and Aberconwy (which included the former Denbighshire parishes) passed to the new Conwy County Borough. The remainder of the county was constituted as a principal area, with the name Caernarfonshire and Merionethshire, as it covers most of the areas of those two historic counties. As one of its first actions, the Council renamed itself Gwynedd on 2 April 1996. The present Gwynedd local government area is governed by Gwynedd Council. As a unitary authority, the modern entity no longer has any districts, but Arfon, Dwyfor and Meirionnydd remain as area committees.

The pre-1996 boundaries were retained as a preserved county for a few purposes such as the Lieutenancy. In 2003, the boundary with Clwyd was adjusted to match the modern local government boundary, so that the preserved county now covers the two local government areas of Gwynedd and Anglesey. Conwy county borough is now entirely within Clwyd.

A Gwynedd Constabulary was formed in 1950 by the merger of the Anglesey, Caernarfonshire and Merionethshire forces. A further amalgamation took place in the 1960s when Gwynedd Constabulary was merged with the Flintshire and Denbighshire county forces, retaining the name Gwynedd. In one proposal for local government reform in Wales, Gwynedd had been proposed as a name for a local authority covering all of north Wales, but the scheme as enacted divided this area between Gwynedd and Clwyd. To prevent confusion, the Gwynedd Constabulary was therefore renamed the North Wales Police.

The Snowdonia National Park was formed in 1951. After the 1974 local authority reorganisation, the park fell entirely within the boundaries of Gwynedd, and was run as a department of Gwynedd County Council. After the 1996 local government reorganisation, part of the park fell under Conwy County Borough, and the park's administration separated from the Gwynedd council. Gwynedd Council still appoints nine of the eighteen members of the Snowdonia National Park Authority; Conwy County Borough Council appoints three; and the Welsh Government appoints the remaining six.

Economy
The county has a mixed economy. An important part of the economy is based on tourism: many visitors are attracted by the many beaches and the mountains. A significant part of the county lies within the Snowdonia National Park, which extends from the north coast down to the district of Meirionnydd in the south. But tourism provides seasonal employment and thus there is a shortage of jobs in the winter.

Agriculture is less important than in the past, especially in terms of the number of people who earn their living on the land, but it remains an important element of the economy.

The most important of the traditional industries is the slate industry, but these days only a small percentage of workers earn their living in the slate quarries.

Industries which have developed more recently include TV and sound studios: the record company Sain has its HQ in the county.

The education sector is also very important for the local economy, including Bangor University and Further Education colleges, Coleg Meirion-Dwyfor and Coleg Menai, both now part of Grŵp Llandrillo Menai.

Welsh speakers

Gwynedd has the highest proportion of people in Wales who can speak Welsh. According to the 2011 census, 65.4% aged three and over stated that they could speak Welsh. It is estimated that 83% of the county's Welsh-speakers are fluent, the highest percentage of all counties in Wales. The age group with the highest proportion of Welsh speakers in Gwynedd were those between ages 5–15, of whom 92.3% stated that they could speak Welsh.

The proportion of Welsh speakers in Gwynedd declined between 1991 and 2001, from 72.1% to 68.7%, even though the proportion of Welsh speakers in Wales as a whole increased during that decade to 20.5%. The Annual Population Survey estimated that as of June 2022, 76.3% of those in Gwynedd aged three years and above could speak Welsh.

There has been considerable inwards migration to Gwynedd, particularly from England. According to the 2021 census, 66.6% of residents had been born in Wales whilst 27.1% were born in England.

Notable people

 Edward II of England (1284–1327), born in Caernarfon Castle
 John Jones (ca.1530–1598), a Franciscan friar, Roman Catholic priest and martyr; born at Clynnog
 Sir Love Jones-Parry, 1st Baronet (1832–1891), landowner and politician, co-founder of the Y Wladfa settlement in Patagonia
 David Lloyd George (1863–1945), statesman and Prime Minister; lived in Llanystumdwy from infancy
 Sir Clough Williams-Ellis (1883–1978), architect of Portmeirion
 Hedd Wyn (1887–1917), poet from the village of Trawsfynydd; killed in WWI
 T. E. Lawrence (1888–1935), archaeologist, army officer and inspiration for Lawrence of Arabia, born in Tremadog
 Leslie Bonnet (1902–1985), RAF officer, writer; originated the Welsh Harlequin duck in Criccieth
 Bryn Fôn (born 1954), actor and singer-songwriter; born in Llanllyfni, Caernarfonshire.
 Sir Dave Brailsford (born 1964), cycling coach; grew up in Deiniolen, near Caernarfon
 Sir Bryn Terfel (born 1965), bass-baritone opera and concert singer from Pant Glas
 Sasha (born 1969), disc jockey, born in Bangor, Gwynedd
 Duffy (born 1984), singer, songwriter and actress; born in Bangor, Gwynedd
 Elin Fflur (born 1984), singer-songwriter, TV and radio presenter; went to Bangor University
 Owain Fôn Williams, (born 1987), footballer with 443 club caps; born and raised in Penygroes, Gwynedd.
 Wayne Hennessey (born 1987), football goalkeeper with 108 caps for Wales; born in Bangor, Gwynedd

See also
 List of High Sheriffs of Gwynedd
 List of Lord Lieutenants of Gwynedd
 List of churches in Gwynedd
 List of places in Gwynedd
 List of schools in Gwynedd
 Llŷn Peninsula
 Snowdonia National Park

References

External links

 
 Bangor University
 Gwynedd Council

Gwynedd
Counties of Wales
Principal areas of Wales
Preserved counties of Wales